Javier Gonzalo Fragoso Rodríguez (19 April 1942 – 28 December 2014) was a Mexican football player and manager.

Club career
Born in Mexico City in 1942, he was a forward for Club América, for whom he made his debut in 1962.

International career
Nicknamed Chalo, he also played for the Mexico national team, participating in the 1966 and the 1970 World Cups, and scoring one goal in the latter. He also competed for Mexico at the 1964 Summer Olympics.

International goals
Scores and results list Mexico's goal tally first.

References

External links
 

1942 births
2014 deaths
Footballers from Mexico City
Association football forwards
Mexico international footballers
Olympic footballers of Mexico
Footballers at the 1964 Summer Olympics
1966 FIFA World Cup players
1970 FIFA World Cup players
Liga MX players
Club América footballers
Club Puebla players
Club Atlético Zacatepec players
CONCACAF Championship-winning players
Mexican footballers